Ryan Grant (born 8 October 1985) is a rugby union coach; the co-owner of a gin business; and a former Scotland international rugby union player. He currently is Head Coach of Glasgow Academicals.

Educated at the Alice Smith School in Kuala Lumpur, Malaysia. He is an ex-soldier; he served in the Royal Corps of Signals, British Army as an Area System Operator from 2002 to 2005.

Rugby Union career

Amateur career

Grant played rugby for the Army before making the grade at Professional level.

In 2016, Grant turned out for Currie in the Scottish Premiership.

In the 2017–18 season he was playing his rugby with Ayr.

Professional career

Weighing in at 249 lb for 6"1 he played prop for provincial side Glasgow Warriors from 2010; becoming Glasgow Warrior No. 186. He previously played for the Scottish professional sides Border Reivers and Edinburgh Rugby making him one of a few players to have played for three of Scotland's professional teams. He was named in the Pro12 Dream Team at the end of the 2012/13 season.

On 25 January 2017 it was announced that Grant had joined Worcester Warriors with immediate effect.

At the start of the 2017–18 season Grant was back in Scotland, this time with Edinburgh Rugby again. He trained with Edinburgh and played in their August match against Newcastle Falcons at The Greenyards.

This short stint at Edinburgh didn't last, and Grant joined their 1872 Cup rivals instead. On 28 September 2017 Grant once again joined Glasgow Warriors on a short-term deal.

International career

Grant made his  debut in the first Test of the 2012 summer tour, starting against  at the Hunter Stadium in New South Wales.

On 7 June 2013, Grant was called up for the British & Irish Lions to cover injured Gethin Jenkins.

Coaching career

It was announced on 8 May 2019 that Grant would be a coach for Glasgow Academicals for the 2019–20 season. When Head Coach Andy Jackson stood down in 2020, Grant was promoted to Head Coach of the club.

Business career

Grant co-owns his own organic gin production company The Garden Shed Drinks Company which he runs with fellow ex-Glasgow Warrior Ruaridh Jackson.

References

External links
ESPN profile

1985 births
Living people
20th-century British Army personnel
Ayr RFC players
Border Reivers players
British & Irish Lions rugby union players from Scotland
Combined Services rugby union players
Currie RFC players
Edinburgh Rugby players
Glasgow Warriors players
Royal Corps of Signals soldiers
Rugby union players from Kirkcaldy
Rugby union props
Scotland 'A' international rugby union players
Scotland international rugby union players
Scottish rugby union coaches
Scottish rugby union players
Worcester Warriors players